There are unincorporated communities lacking elected municipal officers and boundaries with legal status.

Unincorporated communities

References

Unincorporated communities in South Carolina
South Carolina
South Carolina geography-related lists